Kenny Hill is a former professional rugby league footballer who played in the 1980s and 1990s.

Playing career

County Cup Final appearances
Kenny Hill did not play (Kevin Beardmore playing ) in Castleford's 12-12 draw with Bradford Northern in the 1987 Yorkshire County Cup Final during the 1987–88 season at Headingley Rugby Stadium, Leeds on Saturday 17 October 1987, and played  in the 2-11 defeat by Bradford Northern in the 1987 Yorkshire County Cup Final replay during the 1987–88 season at Elland Road, Leeds on Saturday 31 October 1987.

References

External links
Kenny Hill Memory Box Search at archive.castigersheritage.com

Living people
Castleford Tigers players
English rugby league players
Place of birth missing (living people)
Rugby league hookers
Scarborough Pirates players
Year of birth missing (living people)